Lisa DeNell Cook is an American economist who has served as a member of the Federal Reserve Board of Governors since May 23, 2022. She is the first African American woman and first woman of color to sit on the Board. Before her appointment to the Federal Reserve, she was elected to the board of directors of the Federal Reserve Bank of Chicago.

Cook was previously a professor of economics and international relations at Michigan State University and a member of the American Economic Association's Executive Committee. An authority on international economics, especially the Russian economy, she has been involved in advising policymakers from the Obama Administration to the Nigerian and Rwandan governments. Her research is at the intersection of macroeconomics and economic history, with recent work in African-American history and innovation economics. Cook is regarded as one of the few prominent black female economists and has attracted attention within academia for her efforts in mentoring black women and advocating for their inclusion in the field of economics. 

On January 14, 2022, President Joe Biden nominated Cook to serve as Federal Reserve governor; she was confirmed by the U.S. Senate on May 10, and took office on May 23, 2022.

Early life and education
Cook, born 1964, is one of three daughters of Baptist hospital chaplain Payton B. Cook and Georgia College professor of nursing Mary Murray Cook, and was raised in Milledgeville, Georgia. As a child, she was involved in desegregating schools in Georgia, and still has physical scars from being attacked by segregationists when she enrolled in a formerly White school.  She is a cousin of chemist Percy Julian.

She read for a BA in Physics and Philosophy (magna cum laude) from Spelman College in 1986, where she was named a Harry S. Truman Scholar. She proceeded to St Hilda's College, Oxford as Spelman's first Marshall Scholar where she earned another BA in Philosophy, Politics, and Economics in 1988. She took courses towards a Master's Degree in Philosophy at Cheikh Anta Diop University in Senegal. After a mountain climbing trip on Mount Kilimanjaro with an economist, Cook began to seriously consider pursuing a PhD in Economics. She temporarily used a wheelchair due to an automobile accident, when she entered graduate school. Cook earned a PhD in Economics from the University of California, Berkeley in 1997 under the guidance of Barry Eichengreen and David Romer. Her dissertation focused on the underdevelopment of the banking system in czarist and post-Soviet Russia.

Career
Cook was a visiting assistant professor at the Kennedy School of Government at Harvard University and Harvard Business School from 1997 to 2002, where she was Deputy Director of Africa Research at Harvard's Center for International Development. From 2000 to 2001, she was a senior adviser on finance and development at the U.S. Treasury Department as a Council on Foreign Relations International Affairs Fellow. She was a National Fellow and Research Fellow at the Hoover Institution of Stanford University from 2002 to 2005. Cook advised the Nigerian government on its banking reforms in 2005, and the government of Rwanda on economic development. In 2005, Cook joined Michigan State University as an assistant professor, becoming a tenured associate professor in 2013. She served as a Senior Economist in the Obama Administration's Council of Economic Advisers from August 2011 to August 2012.

Early in her career, Cook's research focused on international economics, particularly the Russian economy. Later she has broadened her research on economic growth to focus on the economic history of African-Americans. Her research suggested that violence against African-Americans under the Jim Crow laws led to a lower than expected number of actual patents filed. Together with other economists, she has collated a long-running database on lynching in the United States.

Since 2016, she has directed the American Economic Association's Summer Program for underrepresented minority students. She became a member of the American Economic Association's Executive Committee in 2019.

In November 2020, Cook was named a volunteer member of the Joe Biden presidential transition Agency Review Team to support transition efforts related to the Federal Reserve.

Federal Reserve nomination

In 2021, Senator Sherrod Brown reportedly pushed the Biden Administration to nominate Cook to serve on the Federal Reserve Board of Governors. President Biden officially nominated Cook to be a member of the Board of Governors on January 14, 2022. She is the first Black woman on the Federal Reserve's board.

Hearings were held on Cook's nomination before the Senate Banking Committee on February 3, 2022. On March 16, 2022, the committee deadlocked on Cook's nomination in a party-line vote, forcing the entire Senate to move to discharge her nomination out of the committee. On March 29, 2022, the United States Senate discharged her nomination from the Senate Banking Committee by a 50-49 vote. On April 26, 2022 the Senate attempted to invoke cloture on her nomination, but it was not agreed to by a 47-51 vote because Senators Chris Murphy and Ron Wyden contracted COVID-19 and were unable to vote. No Senate Republican voted for her, characterizing her as unqualified and a left-wing extremist. On May 10, 2022, the Senate confirmed her nomination by a 51-50 vote, with Vice President Kamala Harris casting the tiebreaking vote, after cloture was invoked on her nomination by a 50-49 vote.

Selected works
 Cook, Lisa D. "Trade credit and bank finance: Financing small firms in Russia." Journal of Business venturing 14, no. 5-6 (1999): 493-518.
Cook, Lisa D. "Three essays on internal and external credit markets in post-Soviet and tsarist Russia." University of California, Berkeley, 1997.
 Cook, Lisa D., and Jeffrey Sachs. "Regional public goods in international assistance." Kaul et al., Global public goods: international cooperation in the 21st century (1999): 436-449.
 Beny, Laura N., and Lisa D. Cook. "Metals or management? Explaining Africa's recent economic growth performance." American Economic Review 99, no. 2 (2009): 268-74.
 Cook, Lisa D., and Chaleampong Kongcharoen. The idea gap in pink and black. No. w16331. National Bureau of Economic Research, 2010.
 Cook, Lisa D., Trevon D. Logan, and John M. Parman. "Distinctively black names in the American past." Explorations in Economic History 53 (2014): 64-82.
 Cook, Lisa D. "Violence and economic activity: evidence from African American patents, 1870–1940." Journal of Economic Growth 19, no. 2 (2014): 221-257.

References

External links

Living people
21st-century American economists
21st-century American women educators
21st-century American educators
African-American economists
Alumni of St Hilda's College, Oxford
American women economists
Biden administration personnel
Federal Reserve System governors
Innovation economists
Marshall Scholars
Michigan State University faculty
Obama administration personnel
Presidents of the National Economic Association
Spelman College alumni
UC Berkeley College of Letters and Science alumni
1964 births